Melaleuca platycalyx is a plant in the myrtle family, Myrtaceae, and is endemic to the south-west of Western Australia. It is a small, twiggy shrub with short spikes of purple or pink flowers in spring. The distinguishing features of this species include petals that are bent downwards, an unusually large number of stamens in each flower and unusually large fruits arranged in alternating pairs.

Description
Its leaves are arranged in alternating pairs (decussate) so that there are four rows of leaves along the branches.

The flowers are a shade of pink or purple and are arranged in short spikes which develop from the sides of the branches. The stamens are arranged in five bundles around the flower, each bundle containing 25 to 36 stamens.

Taxonomy and naming
Melaleuca platycalyx was first formally described in 1904 by Ludwig Diels in Botanische Jahrbücher für Systematik, Pflanzengeschichte und Pflanzengeographie.  The specific epithet (platycalyx) is derived from the Ancient Greek words πλατύς (platús) meaning "flat" and kalyx meaning "cup", "cover" or "outer envelope of a flower", apparently referring to the shape of the hypanthium.

Distribution and habitat
Melaleuca platycalyx occurs in and between the Latham, Ongerup and Lake King districts in the Avon Wheatbelt, Coolgardie, Esperance Plains, Geraldton Sandplains, Jarrah Forest and Mallee biogeographic regions. It grows in sandy and gravelly soils on sandplains and near granite rocks.

Conservation
This species is classified as "not threatened" by the Government of Western Australia Department of Parks and Wildlife.

Uses

Horticulture
This species is only known in cultivation in a few places but is a moderately hardy plant in areas with lower humidity than the east coast of Australia. Other purple-flowered melaleucas may be more attractive but the foliage and fruits are features.

References

platycalyx
Myrtales of Australia
Plants described in 1904
Endemic flora of Western Australia
Taxa named by Ludwig Diels